is a Japanese playwright, scriptwriter, stage director and actor represented by Watanabe Entertainment

Biography
Suemitsu was born in Osaka Prefecture on June 18, 1976. He initially worked as an actor in small theatres in the Kansai region. In 2002, Suemitsu formed the theatre group Peacepit, where he presented works that he wrote and directed.

Works

Stage productions
TRUMP series 
 PEACEPIT VOL.10 "TRUMP" (2009)
 PEACEPIT VOL.16 "TRINITY THE TRUMP" (2012)
 Dstage12th "TRUMP" (2013)
 Theatrical Women's Club Musical "LILIUM" (2014)
 Patch stage vol.6 "SPECTER" (2015)
 Theatrical Women's Club Musical "LILIUM" - Thanksgiving, short story "Two-flower bloom" (2015)
 NAPPOS UNITED stage play "TRUMP" (2015)
 PEACEPIT stage play "Grand Guignol" (2017)
 Musical "Marigold" (2018)
 COCOON Tsugi no Kageri (2019)
 COCOON Hoshi Hitotsu (2019)

Theater Company Patch
 Patch stage vol.1 "OLIVER BOYS" (2012)
 Patch stage vol.2 "Cave Boy" (2013)
 Patch stage vol.3 "Thief quintet" (2013)
 Patch stage vol.4 "Destruction runner" (2014)
 Patch stage vol.6 "SPECTER" (2015)
 Patch stage vol.7 "Yuuhiden" (2015)
 Patch stage EX "Four Contacts - Thank you! Thanks !! Theatrical Company Patch 4th Grade Announcement Festival !!" (2016)
 Patch stage vol.8 "Ukiyo drama - Isobe Iso Hyōe's story - Ukiyo is tough" (2016)
 Patch stage vol.9 "Ukiyo drama - Isobe Iso Hyōe's story - Ukiyo is tough - Sunny version" (2016)
 Patch stage vol.10 "Hanyū hasutarō" (2017)
 Patch × TRUMP series 10th ANNIVERSARY "SPECTER" (2019)

Hello! Project
 Theatrical Women's Club Musical "LILIUM" (2014)
 Theatrical Women's Club Musical "LILIUM" - Thanksgiving, short story "Two-flower bloom" (2015)

 Stage play "K"
 Stage play "K" (2014)
 Stage play "K - Second Chapter" (2015)
 Stage play "K - Lost Small World" (2016)
 Stage play "K - MISSING KINGS" (2017)
 Stage play "K - RETURN OF KINGS" (2019)

Stage Play Touken Ranbu
 Stage play "Touken Ranbu - Kyoden: Moyuru Honnoji - Shoen" (2016)
 Stage play "Touken Ranbu - Kyoden: Moyuru Honnoji - Saien" (2016)
 Stage play "Touken Ranbu - Giden: Akatsuki no Dokuganryu" (2017)
 Stage play "Touken Ranbu - Gaiden: Kono Yora no Odawara" (2017)
 Stage play "Touken Ranbu - Joden: Mitsuraboshi Katana Gatari" (2017)
 Stage play "Touken Ranbu  - Hiden: Yui no Me no Hototogisu" (2018)
 Stage play "Touken Ranbu - Jiden: Hibi no Ha Yo Chiruran" (2019)
 Stage play "Touken Ranbu - Iden: Oboro no Shishitachi" (2019))
 Stage play "Touken Ranbu - New stage" (2020)

Others
 Stage play "Demon Slayer: Kimetsu no Yaiba" (2020)

Anime
 Touken Ranbu Kyoden Moyuru Honnōji (TBA, screenplay)

References

External links
Kenichi Suemitsu official profile 
末満健一 (@suemitsu) on Twitter

1976 births
21st-century Japanese dramatists and playwrights
Japanese theatre directors
Living people
Male actors from Osaka Prefecture